Ormonde is a surname occurring in Portugal (mainly Azores), Brazil, England, and United States. It may refer to:

People
 Ann Ormonde (born 1935), an Irish politician
 James Ormond or Ormonde (c. 1418–1497), the illegitimate son of John Butler, 6th Earl of Ormonde, and Princess Margret of Thormond
 John Ormonde (1905–1981), a senior Irish Fianna Fáil politician
 Paul Ormond or Ormonde (born 1977), an Irish sportsperson

Places
 Ormonde Island, Nunavut, Canada
 Ormonde, Gauteng, a suburb of Johannesburg, South Africa
 Ormonde (Cazenovia, New York), a mansion listed on the U.S. National Register of Historic Places

Other uses
 The British peerage of the Earl of Ormonde
 Ormonde (1883–1904), a thoroughbred racehorse
 Ormonde Wind Farm in the Irish Sea
 Ormonde Motor Company, manufacturer of motorcycles 1900–1904

See also
 Ormond (surname)
 Ormond (disambiguation)